Miloš Šarčev (Serbian Cyrillic: Милош Шарчев; born January 17, 1964) is an IFBB bodybuilder from Bečej, Serbia.

Biography
Šarčev was Mr. Yugoslavia twice and in 1989 he won the Mr. Universe title. Šarčev nearly died when he struck a vein in one of his triceps while injecting Synthol, a popular site enhancement oil.

Stats
Height: 
Off Season Weight: 
Competition Weight: 
Upper Arm Size:  
Chest Size: 
Thigh Size: 
Waist Size:

Contest history

1988 AAU Mr. Universe, Light-Heavyweight, 3rd
1989 WPF Mr. Universe, Light-Heavyweight, 1st
1991 Grand Prix Denmark, 5th
1991 Grand Prix England, 9th
1991 Grand Prix Finland, 4th
1991 Grand Prix Italy, 7th
1991 Grand Prix Spain, 7th
1991 Grand Prix Switzerland, 6th
1991 Niagara Falls Pro Invitational, 4th
1991 Night of Champions, 11th
1991 Mr. Olympia, 16th 
1991 San Jose Pro Invitational, 3rd
1992 Arnold Classic, 8th
1992 Chicago Pro Invitational, 5th
1992 Grand Prix England, 8th
1992 Grand Prix Germany, 10th
1992 Grand Prix Holland, 12th
1992 Grand Prix Italy, 10th
1992 Ironman Pro Invitational, 6th
1992 Niagara Falls Pro Invitational, 4th
1992 Night of Champions, 5th
1992 Mr. Olympia, 16th
1992 Pittsburgh Pro Invitational, 4th
1993 Chicago Pro Invitational, 3rd
1993 Grand Prix England, 5th
1993 Grand Prix Finland, 3rd
1993 Grand Prix France (2), 3rd
1993 Grand Prix Germany (2), 5th
1993 Grand Prix Spain, 4th
1993 Niagara Falls Pro Invitational, 3rd
1993 Night of Champions, 5th
1993 Mr. Olympia, 11th
1993 Pittsburgh Pro Invitational, 3rd
1994 Grand Prix England, 8th
1994 Grand Prix France (2), 6th
1994 Grand Prix Germany, 4th
1994 Grand Prix Italy, 4th
1994 Grand Prix Spain, 4th
1994 Mr. Olympia, 13th
1995 Canada Pro Cup, 3rd
1995 Houston Pro Invitational, 5th
1995 Niagara Falls Pro Invitational, 4th
1995 Night of Champions, 6th
1996 Canada Pro Cup, 3rd
1996 Florida Pro Invitational, 3rd
1996 Night of Champions, 4th
1997 Canada Pro Cup, 1st
1997 Grand Prix Czech Republic, 8th
1997 Grand Prix England, 8th
1997 Grand Prix Finland, 8th
1997 Grand Prix Germany, 7th
1997 Grand Prix Hungary, 7th
1997 Grand Prix Russia, 7th
1997 Grand Prix Spain, 9th
1997 Night of Champions, 2nd
1997 Mr. Olympia, 10th
1997 Toronto Pro Invitational, 1st
1998 Grand Prix Finland, 5th
1998 Grand Prix Germany, 5th
1998 Night of Champions, 11th
1998 Mr. Olympia, 11th
1998 San Francisco Pro Invitational, 5th
1998 Toronto Pro Invitational, 7th
1999 Arnold Classic, 5th
1999 Grand Prix England, 5th
1999 Ironman Pro Invitational, 2nd
1999 Night of Champions, 5th
1999 Mr. Olympia, 10th
1999 Toronto Pro Invitational, 2nd
1999 World Pro Championships, 5th
2001 Night of Champions, 10th
2001 Toronto Pro Invitational, 7th
2003 Grand Prix Hungary, 6th
2003 Night of Champions, 9th

See also
 List of male professional bodybuilders

References

External links
 
 
 Milos Sarcev interview with evolutionofbodybuilding.net

1964 births
Living people
People from Bečej
Serbian bodybuilders
Professional bodybuilders